The Little Girls was a novelty band formed by the sisters Caron Maso (guitar, vocals) and Michele Maso (vocals) from the San Fernando Valley in Los Angeles in the early 1980s. Kip Brown (lead guitar, vocals), Steve Sicular (guitar) and Jeff Fair (drums) comprised the band.

They had two hits, "Earthquake Song" and "How to Pick Up Girls". Both of these songs were hits on KROQ, an album-oriented rock radio station in the Los Angeles market that played new wave almost exclusively at that time. “Earthquake Song” was also featured in a dance segment running 12 weeks on Dick Clark’s American Bandstand on the ABC television network. They opened for many well-known acts such as The Call, The Plimsouls, The Boomtown Rats, Billy Idol, Janis Ian, and The Pretenders. Their only release, the Mini-LP Thank Heaven! was released in 1983, co-produced by famed Ramones and Mick Jagger producer Ed Stasium. The music video for "How to Pick Up Girls" (also directed by Stasium) was aired on MTV.

In 2004 the band reunited for a one-time-only show in Santa Monica, California.

Discography
The Podolor-Cooper Sessions, 1982
Thank Heaven! Mini-LP, 1983
The Clear Album EP, 1985
No More Vinyl....., 2006
Thank Heaven For Valleypop: The Original and Previous Unreleased Versions Recorded 1980-1985, 2009 (released and unreleased versions of Thank Heaven! and The Clear Album)
Today and Yesterday, 2009 (2006 reunion recordings with rarities from the 1980s)

References

External links
 

American comedy musical groups
Sibling musical duos
Musical groups from California
People from San Fernando, California
American new wave musical groups
Musical groups established in 1983
American musical duos
Comedians from California